Andreu Blanes Reig (born 14 October 1991) is a Spanish orienteering competitor and long-distance runner. He was born in Onil. He won a silver medal in sprint at the 2011 Junior World Orienteering Championships, and placed fourth in the relay. He competed at the 2018 World Orienteering Championships in Latvia, where he placed seventh in the sprint final. He has competed in the 2011, 2012, 2013, 2014, 2015, 2016, 2017 and 2018 World Orienteering Championships. His best World Championship result before 2018 was a seventh place in the sprint at the 2015 World Orienteering Championships.

In 2022, he won a silver medal in the team up and downhill race at the World Mountain and Trail Running Championships. He competed in the senior race at the 2023 World Athletics Cross Country Championships, where he finished 55th.

Personal bests
Outdoor
1500 m: 3:45.56 (Barcelona 2021)
3000 m: 8:07.72 (Castellón 2020)
2000 m steeplechase: 5:41.35 (Barcelona 2020)
3000 m steeplechase: 8:33.22 (Castellón 2020)
5000 m: 14:25.16 (Onil 2020)
10,000 m: 30:43.12 (Andújar 2018)
10K (road): 28:50 (Valencia 2020)
Half marathon: 1:02:40 (Valencia 2021)

Indoor
1500 m: 3:48.77 (Madrid 2019)
3000 m: 7:52.40 (Valencia 2021)

International Athletics Competitions

References

External links
Ranking

Spanish orienteers
Spanish male long-distance runners
Male orienteers
1991 births
Living people
People from Alcoià
Sportspeople from the Province of Alicante
Competitors at the 2017 World Games
Junior World Orienteering Championships medalists
21st-century Spanish people